Golden Era is the debut album by Portuguese pop singer Rita Redshoes, released in 2008.

Track listing

 To Start…
 The Beginning Song
 Hey Tom
 Choose Love
 Oh My Mr. Blue
 Golden Era I
 Once I Found You
 Dream On Girl
 Blue Bird On A Sunny Day
 Minimal Sounds
 Your Waltz
 Love, What Is It?
 Love Is, Love You

References

2008 debut albums